Carabus verecundus, is a species of ground beetle in the large genus Carabus.

References 

verecundus
Insects described in 2010